Gurbuja (also Romanized as Gūrbūjā; also known as Gūryūjā) is a village in Surak Rural District, Lirdaf District, Jask County, Hormozgan Province, Iran. At the 2006 census, its population was 105, in 24 families.

References 

Populated places in Jask County